Vladimir Konstantinovich Nemshilov (born 24 November 1948) is a retired Soviet swimmer. He won a bronze medal in the 4×100 m medley relay and finished fourth in the 100 m butterfly at the 1968 Summer Olympics, setting a new European record (US swimmers took the first three places). He won two bronze medals in the same events at the 1970 European Aquatics Championships. In 1969, he set a European record in the 100 m butterfly event. During his career he won nine national titles, in the 100 m (1968–1971, 1973, 1974) and 200 m (1973) butterfly and 4×100 m medley relay events (1974, 1975), and set four national records.

Since the introduction of masters championships in the Soviet Union he competes in this category. He won the world championships in 1992 and European championships in 1995 in the 50 m butterfly, and finished second in the 100 m butterfly in 1995.

He lives in Moscow where he works as a swimming coach. He regularly visits his mother and elder sister Nina in Sochi, the city where he was born and raised. Since 2008, the local swimming championships carry his name. In 2010, they were attended by four former Olympians, and one of them, Alex Popov, even took part in a swimming event.

References

1948 births
Living people
Russian male butterfly swimmers
Olympic swimmers of the Soviet Union
Swimmers at the 1968 Summer Olympics
Olympic bronze medalists for the Soviet Union
Olympic bronze medalists in swimming
European Aquatics Championships medalists in swimming
Medalists at the 1968 Summer Olympics
Soviet male freestyle swimmers